NASL Soccer is a 1980 Intellivision two-player game based on the North American Soccer League (1968–1984). Mattel released an Atari 2600 version of the game under its M Network label as International Soccer.

Reception
Video magazine's "1982 Guide to Electronic Games" found the game gameplay and implementation (its three-quarter perspective and scrolling playfield) "fascinating even to those who don't care for the real sport".

References

1980 video games
Association football video games
Intellivision games
North America-exclusive video games
Mattel video games
Multiplayer and single-player video games
Video games developed in the United States